is a former Japanese cyclist. He competed at the 1960 Summer Olympics and the 1964 Summer Olympics.

References

External links
 

1938 births
Living people
Japanese male cyclists
Olympic cyclists of Japan
Cyclists at the 1960 Summer Olympics
Cyclists at the 1964 Summer Olympics
Sportspeople from Iwate Prefecture
Asian Games medalists in cycling
Cyclists at the 1962 Asian Games
Medalists at the 1962 Asian Games
Asian Games silver medalists for Japan